4-Hydroxyamphetamine (4HA), also known as hydroxyamfetamine, hydroxyamphetamine, oxamphetamine, norpholedrine, para-hydroxyamphetamine, and α-methyltyramine, is a drug that stimulates the sympathetic nervous system.

It is used medically in eye drops to dilate the pupil (a process called mydriasis), so that the back of the eye can be examined.  It is also a major metabolite of amphetamine and certain substituted amphetamines.

Medical use
4-Hydroxyamphetamine is used in eye drops to dilate the pupil (a process called mydriasis) so that the back of the eye can be examined.  This is a diagnostic test for Horner's syndrome.  Patients with Horner's syndrome exhibit anisocoria brought about by lesions on the nerves that connect to the nasociliary branch of the ophthalmic nerve. Application of 4-hydroxyamphetamine to the eye can indicate whether the lesion is preganglionic or postganglionic based on the pupil's response. If the pupil dilates, the lesion is preganglionic. If the pupil does not dilate, the lesion is postganglionic.

4-hydroxyamphetamine has some limitations to its use as a diagnostic tool. If it is intended as an immediate follow up to another mydriatic drug (cocaine or apraclonidine), then the patient must wait anywhere from a day to a week before 4-hydroxyamphetamine can be administered. It also has the tendency to falsely localize lesions. False localization can arise in cases of acute onset; in cases where a postganglionic lesion is present, but the nerve still responds to residual norepinephrine; or in cases in which unrelated nerve damage masks the presence of a preganglionic lesion.

Pharmacology

Like amphetamine, 4-hydroxyamphetamine is an agonist of human TAAR1. 4-Hydroxyamphetamine acts as an indirect sympathomimetic and causes the release of norepinephrine from nerve synapses which leads to mydriasis (pupil dilation).

It decreases metabolism of serotonin (5-hydroxytryptamine) and certain other monoamines by inhibiting the activity of a family of enzymes called monoamine oxidases (MAOs), particularly type A (MAO-A). The inhibition of MAO-A prevents metabolism of serotonin and catecholamines in the presynaptic terminal, and thus increases the amount of neurotransmitters available for release into the synaptic cleft.   4-Hydroxyamphetamine is a major metabolite of amphetamine and a minor metabolite of methamphetamine. In humans, amphetamine is metabolized to 4-hydroxyamphetamine by CYP2D6, which is a member of the cytochrome P450 superfamily and is found in the liver. 4-Hydroxyamphetamine is then metabolized by dopamine beta-hydroxylase into 4-hydroxynorephedrine or eliminated in the urine.

Commercialization
Hydroxyamphetamine is a component of two controlled (prescription only), name-brand ophthalmic mydriatics: Paredrine and Paremyd. Paredrine consists of a 1% solution of hydroxyamphetamine hydrobromide while Paremyd consists of a combination of 1% hydroxyamphetamine hydrobromide and 0.25% tropicamide. In the 1990s, the trade name rights, patents, and new drug applications (NDAs) for the two formulations were exchanged among a few different manufacturers after a shortage of the raw material required for their production, which caused both drugs to be indefinitely removed from the market. Around 1997, Akorn, Inc., obtained the rights to both Paredrine and Paremyd, and in 2002, the company reintroduced Paremyd to the market as a fast acting ophthalmic mydriatic agent.

See also 
 Amphetamine
 Pholedrine
 Tyramine

Notes

Reference notes

References

External links 
 

Phenols
Sympathomimetics
Amphetamine
Substituted amphetamines
TAAR1 agonists
Norepinephrine-dopamine releasing agents